Trayodashi is the Sanskrit word for "thirteen", and is the thirteenth day in the lunar fortnight (Paksha) of the Hindu calendar. Each month has two Thrayodashi days, being the thirteenth day of the "bright" (Shukla) and of the "dark" (Krishna) fortnights respectively. Thus Thrayodashi occurs on the thirteenth and the twenty-eighth day of each month.

Festivals
 Dhanteras, also called Dhantrayodasi, is the first day of Diwali. It occurs on Thrayodashi in the month of Ashvin.

References

Hindu calendar
13